Travis Jordan Banwart (born February 14, 1986) is an American former professional baseball starting pitcher. He previously played in the KBO League for the SK Wyverns and KT Wiz. He also played in the Chinese Professional Baseball League (CPBL) for the Fubon Guardians.

Career

Amateur
Banwart attended Goddard High School and Wichita State University. In 2006, he played collegiate summer baseball for the Wareham Gatemen of the Cape Cod Baseball League, and was named a league all-star. He was drafted by the Oakland Athletics in the 4th round of the 2007 Major League Baseball Draft.

Oakland Athletics
He made his professional debut with the Kane County Cougars in 2007, going 2-1 with a save and a 2.60 ERA, walking 10 in 45 innings. He split 2008 between Kane County and the Stockton Ports. In 2009, he was 10-5 with a 4.89 ERA for the Midland RockHounds and appeared in a game with the Triple-A Sacramento River Cats.

In 2010, Banwart played for Double-A Midland, Triple-A Sacramento, and the Phoenix Desert Dogs of the Arizona Fall League. 2011 was his first full year at Triple-A; he went 9-9 with a 4.63 ERA. He had a 9-5 record and a 3.85 ERA for the 2012 River Cats. In 2013, he was 10-5 with a 4.60 ERA in 29 games (23 starts) for Sacramento.

Cleveland Indians
On November 4, 2013, Banwart chose to become a free agent and on December 13 he signed with the Cleveland Indians.

KBO League
Banwart signed with SK Wyverns of the KBO League in July 2014. He pitched for the Wyverns for two seasons, and moved to the KT Wiz in 2016.

Second stint with Indians
On December 16, 2016, Banwart signed a minor league contract with the Indians. He elected free agency on November 6, 2017.

Wichita Wingnuts
On March 21, 2018, Banwart signed with the Wichita Wingnuts of the independent American Association.

Cleburne Railroaders
He was traded on October 5, 2018, to the Cleburne Railroaders for cash considerations.

Pericos de Puebla
On January 23, 2019, Banwart's contract was purchased by the Pericos de Puebla of the Mexican League. He was released on May 26, 2019.

Long Island Ducks
On June 7, 2019, Banwart signed with the Long Island Ducks of the Atlantic League of Professional Baseball.

Fubon Guardians
On July 16, 2019, Banwart's contract was purchased by the Fubon Guardians of the Chinese Professional Baseball League. He became a free agent following the season.

Long Island Ducks (second stint)
On March 11, 2020, Banwart signed with the Long Island Ducks of the Atlantic League. He did not play a game for the team because of the cancellation of the ALPB season due to the COVID-19 pandemic and became a free agent after the year.

References

External links

Career statistics and player information from KBO League

1986 births
Living people
SSG Landers players
KT Wiz players
Wichita State Shockers baseball players
Wareham Gatemen players
Kane County Cougars players
Stockton Ports players
Midland RockHounds players
Sacramento River Cats players
Columbus Clippers players
American expatriate baseball players in South Korea
KBO League pitchers
Akron RubberDucks players
Wichita Wingnuts players
Pericos de Puebla players
American expatriate baseball players in Mexico
Long Island Ducks players
Fubon Guardians players
American expatriate baseball players in Taiwan